The Jim Murray Memorial Handicap is an American Thoroughbred horse race run in mid-May
at Hollywood Park Racetrack in Inglewood, California. The Grade II 
event is open to horses, age three and up, willing to race one and one-half miles on turf.

The race was run at one and one-quarter miles (10 furlongs) in 1990, 1999 and 2000.

Records
Speed  record: (at current distance of  miles)
 2:25.31 - Storming Home (GB) (2003)

Most wins:
 2 - On the Acorn (GB) (2007, 2008)
 2 - Acclamation (2010, 2011)

Most wins by a jockey:
 3 - Corey Nakatani (1992, 1998, 1999)
 3 - Gary Stevens (1991, 1997, 2003)

Most wins by a trainer:
 6 - Robert Frankel (1990, 1992, 1993, 1994, 1998, 2002)

Most wins by an owner:
 4 - Juddmonte Farms (1990, 1992, 1993, 2002)

Winners of the Jim Murray Memorial Handicap

† Run at ten furlongs in 1990, 1999 and 2000.

References
Hollywood Park Media Guide

Graded stakes races in the United States
1990 establishments in California
Horse races in California
Turf races in the United States
Hollywood Park Racetrack
Recurring sporting events established in 1990